Kya, kya or KYA may also refer to:

People or fictional characters
 Kya Lau, chef and contestant on MasterChef Junior, season 4
 Kya, mother of Katara and Sokka, in Avatar: The Last Airbender
 Kya, daughter of Aang and Katara in The Legend of Korra
 KYA, Christina Parie's former stage name

Other uses
 kya (unit), an abbreviation for "kilo years ago", that is, a thousand years ago
 Konya Airport's IATA code
 KYA (AM), a San Francisco, California, radio station
 KYA-FM, a San Francisco, California, radio station

See also
 Kea (disambiguation)
 Kia (disambiguation)
 Kya: Dark Lineage, a 2003 video game
 Kyai, an expert in Islam